Dave Elsey (born 9 February 1967) is a make-up artist known for special make-up effects, creature effects and animatronics in films such as X-Men: First Class, Ghost Rider, Star Wars, Hellraiser, Alien 3, and Indiana Jones . He was born on February 2, 1967, in London, England to Marie and Derek Elsey. From 1999 to 2011, Elsey lived in Sydney, Australia with his wife Lou while working on the TV science fiction series Farscape. He currently resides in Los Angeles, California.

Career

Gallery

To view some of the classic and memorable characters created by Elsey, visit Dave's IGOR Studio webpage gallery at http://igorstudios.com/gallery/

Recent Achievements

Star Wars: Episode III 
Elsey, a huge Star Wars fan as a child, was elated to be given the opportunity in 2005 to work on the Star Wars: Episode III – Revenge of the Sith movie. The work resulted in an Oscar nomination for the creature effects / make-up effects department: a first for that department on a Star Wars film.

The Wolfman 
In 2010, Elsey and his long admired icon Rick Baker partnered up for the film "The Wolfman," winning an Academy Award.

The Early Years

Mentors and Developing Technique

Elsey's early childhood was filled with fascination and love for movies and special effects. When he was about ten or eleven, Elsey met Chris Tucker, a talented Make-up Artist who contributed significant work to films like Star Wars Episode IV, Quest For Fire, Phantom of the Opera, and Elephant Man. Tucker mentored Elsey, showing him how to make various things like casting a face or sculpting prosthetics. Tucker shared with Elsey that when he was starting out, he used to make rubber noses for the makeup shop Charles H Fox, and they would sometimes pay him with makeup. Elsey followed in Tucker's footsteps and did the same thing; make-up was, and is very expensive, so it was good advice.

The industry was so secretive, and there were no good text books, plus it seemed at the time that he was the only kid he knew interested in monsters and makeup, so Elsey had to struggle to develop technique. He used to do things like study photos of makeup artists like Dick Smith in magazines, trying to figure out what materials were on their shelves in the background. Eventually an aunt recognized his talents, and allowed him to use a small room in her house as a workshop.

Idols and First Breaks

Two pivotal movies he recalls seeing with his father in Leicester Square (West end of London, England) were King Kong (1976) and An American Werewolf in London (1981).  After viewing the work of special make-up effects artist Rick Baker in both films, especially the latter, make-up effects became Elsey's career ambition. In 1983, at the age of sixteen, Elsey met Baker on the set of the film Greystoke: The Legend of Tarzan, Lord of the Apes. That meeting reaffirmed Elsey's plan to make makeup his career.

Dreams of working in the film industry started forming during visits to Pinewood Studios, Shepperton Studios, and Elstree Studios in various counties in England. Elsey frequently ran into Jim Henson (Sesame Street, The Muppet Show) while on the lot. He eventually met Lyle Conway who was Henson's creature shop designer on The Dark Crystal. After repeated requests for a job, Conway gave Elsey his first break in the industry, putting him to work creating animatronics for the movie Little Shop of Horrors. In the course of his work, Elsey made many of the special Vine effects as well as the tongue of alien plant Audrey II. The experience taught Elsey the art of using mechanical effects to create the illusion of life in puppetry. They did a lot of reverse shots, turned the camera upside down, changed camera speeds, and other things that most engineers would not have considered as solutions. That movie went on to be nominated for an Oscar for the plant, and won the Academy Award for Best Visual Effects in 1986.

Farscape, Australia

In 1999, Elsey was asked to supervise the Australian branch of the Jim Henson's Creature Shop about two months before the series Farscape was launched. Although Rygel and Pilot were complete, a significant number of characters were not designed yet. Elsey used the opportunity to create characters puppets and makeups using every technique he could think of, resulting in many intricate and visually stunning alien creatures cult fans came to love.

Industry Awards

Saturn Award Nominations: Best Make-up
38th Saturn Awards 2012 - X-Men: First Class, shared with Frank Needham and Conor O'Sullivan. Won.
Academy Award Nominations: Best Makeup and Hairstyling
83rd Academy Awards - The Wolfman, shared with Rick Baker. Won.
78th Academy Awards - Nominated for Star Wars: Episode III – Revenge of the Sith. Nomination shared with Nikki Gooley. Lost to The Chronicles of Narnia: The Lion, the Witch and the Wardrobe.
Quanta's Film: Achievement in Make-Up Design in Film
2008 Qantas Film and Television Awards: Achievement in Make-Up Design in Film - Black Sheep (2007). Won.

Filmography

Television
 Trading Races Documentary | Make Up Effects Supervisor
 Farscape Seasons 1-4 (88 eps) | Creature Effects Supervisor
 Farscape ‘Peacekeeper Wars’ | Creature Effects Supervisor
 Big Garage | Creature Effects Supervisor
 Cold Lazarus | Make Up Effects Supervisor
 How to be a Little Sod | Make Up/ Animatronic Supervisor
 Hunting Venus| Make Up Effects Supervisor
 Prime Suspect 5 | Make Up Effects Supervisor
 Silent Witness 7 | Make Up Effects Supervisor
 Seaforth | Make Up Effects Supervisor
 The Comic Strip | Make Up Effects Supervisor
 The Hunger | Make Up Effects Supervisor
 The Wanderer | Make Up Effects Supervisor
 The Toon Room | Animatronics Supervisor
 The Uninvited | Make Up Effects Supervisor
 Big Garage | Animatronics Supervisor
 Casualty | Make Up Effects Supervisor

Television Commercials
 Allied Dunbar – ‘Grim Reaper’ (1997) | Creature Effects Supervisor
 Angel Delight – Moosehead | Creature Effects Supervisor
 Bonaqua – Chicken | Creature Effects Supervisor
 Bonaqua – ‘Mermaid’ | Make Up Effects Supervisor
 Bosch – Handtools | Make Up Effects Supervisor
 Campbells – Malcolm meatball | Creature Effects Supervisor
 Conservative Party ‘evil eyes’ | Make Up Effects Supervisor
 Der Spiegal – ‘Aliens’ | Creature Effects Supervisor
 Golden Wonder -Nik Naks Alien | Creature Effects Supervisor
 Heart fm – ‘Alien’ | Creature Effects Supervisor
 Mc Donalds – Cavemen | Make Up Effects Supervisor
 NAB – Yeti | Make Up Effects Supervisor
 NSPCC – ‘Foetus’ | Make Up Effects Supervisor
 Nike – Good Vs Evil: Demon | Creature Effects Supervisor
 Nike – ‘History’ | Make Up Effects Supervisor
 Pirelli – Goddess | Creature Effects Supervisor
 Pizza Hut – ‘Klingons’ | Make Up Effects Supervisor
 Ronseal Tiles – Pelican | Creature Effects Supervisor
 Slotts Mustard | Creature Effects Supervisor
 Tabboo – Tango Football ‘Hell’ | Creature Effects Supervisor
 USPS – Monster | Creature Effects Supervisor
 VB – Shane Warne characters | Make Up Effects Supervisor
 Westlights | Creature Effects Supervisor
 Xbox – Demon | Creature Effects Supervisor
 Yellow Pages – Clown | Make Up Effects Supervisor

Music Promos and Stills
 Massive Attack – Teardrop | Creature Effects Supervisor
 Aphex Twin – Come to Daddy | Make Up Effects Supervisor
 Bluetones – Marblehead Johnson | Make Up Effects Supervisor
 Blur – ‘Girls and Boys’ | Make Up Effects Supervisor
 Leftfield – ‘Afrika Shocks’ | Make Up Effects Supervisor
 Manic Street Preachers – ‘If you tolerate this’ | Make up Effects
 Warrant – ‘Dirty rotten filthy stinking rich’ | Make up Effects

References

External links

Best Makeup Academy Award winners
Living people
British make-up artists
Place of birth missing (living people)
1967 births